Clement Wilson (born 11 May 1976) is a journalist, author and travel writer. Born in Ireland, he was educated at Glenalmond College and Trinity College, Dublin and currently lives in Edinburgh. His journalism has appeared in numerous newspapers and magazines and he has written books on the Gumball 3000 rally (with jockey Richard Dunwoody) and Iceland amongst other subjects. He is a member of The British Guild of Travel Writers and the Chartered Institute of Journalists.

References

1976 births
Living people
Alumni of Trinity College Dublin
Irish journalists
20th-century travel writers
Irish travel writers
People educated at Glenalmond College
21st-century Irish journalists